The Roman Catholic Diocese of Grodno is a diocese located in the city of Grodno in the Ecclesiastical province of Minsk-Mohilev in Belarus.

History
 13 April 1991: Established as Diocese of Grodno

Leadership
 Bishops of Grodno (Roman rite)
 Aleksander Kaszkiewicz (Аляксандр Кашкевіч) (since 13 Apr 1991)

Churches 
 Church of Saint Anthony of Padua (Dwarec) in 
 Church of Saint Wenceslaus in Vawkavysk
 Church of the Assumption in Dzyatlava

See also
Roman Catholicism in Belarus
List of Roman Catholic dioceses in Belarus

References

Sources
 GCatholic.org
 Catholic Hierarchy

Roman Catholic dioceses in Belarus
Roman Catholic dioceses established in 1991
Roman Catholic dioceses and prelatures established in the 20th century
1991 establishments in Belarus